The 2014 Qatar motorcycle Grand Prix was the first round of the 2014 MotoGP season. It was held at the Losail International Circuit in Doha on 23 March 2014.

In the MotoGP class, Marc Márquez began his title defence with a victory ahead of Valentino Rossi and teammate Dani Pedrosa. Rossi's teammate, Jorge Lorenzo led at the start but then crashed and had his bike destroyed in the gravel trap. 

The MotoGP race also saw the début of the new "Factory" and "Open" classes for each bike. The MSMA prototypes were reclassified as the "Factory" class, and the Claiming Rule Teams sub-category was rebranded as the "Open" class. Bikes in the Open class used the same MotoGP ECU and identical software, and the teams that were in the Factory class were permitted to use their own software.

In the Moto2 race, Esteve Rabat began his title-winning season with a victory ahead of fellow Kalex  rider Mika Kallio and Suter rider Thomas Lüthi. The fastest lap was set by Maverick Viñales in his first and only season in the Moto2 class.

The Moto3 race saw Jack Miller take the victory ahead of Spaniards Álex Márquez and Efrén Vázquez. Both Miller and Márquez would eventually fight for the title over the course of the season, with the latter eventually taking the title by two points.

Classification

MotoGP

Moto2

Moto3

Championship standings after the race (MotoGP)
Below are the standings for the top five riders and constructors after round one has concluded.

Riders' Championship standings

Constructors' Championship standings

 Note: Only the top five positions are included for both sets of standings.

References

Qatar motorcycle Grand Prix
Qatar
Motorcycle Grand Prix
Qatar motorcycle Grand Prix